The Next Best Thing is an American reality TV series competition of celebrity impersonators with a grand prize of $100,000. It was hosted by Michele Merkin. The judges were Jeffrey Ross, Elon Gold and Lisa Ann Walter; ultimately, the winner was chosen by viewer voting.  The eight-episode series debuted May 30, 2007 on ABC and ended the same year.

Episodes

The premiere featured contestants impersonating (among others) Howard Stern, Jack Nicholson, Jackie Gleason, Art Carney, Superman, Jennifer Aniston, Janet Jackson, Bill Cosby, Billy Crystal, Whoopi Goldberg, Phil McGraw, Hank Williams Jr., Arthur (Fonzie) Fonzarelli, and Avril Lavigne.

Semi-finals
The judges narrowed down the contestants to 30 semi-finalists, 28 of whom were featured in fully shown performances over two episodes. The semi-finalists were:

 Chris America as Madonna
 Sandy Anderson as Dolly Parton
 Sebastian Anzaldo as Frank Sinatra
 David Born as Robin Williams
 Trent Carlini as Elvis Presley
 Erv Dahl as Rodney Dangerfield
 Donny Edwards as Elvis Presley
 Marcel Forestieri as Jay Leno
 Craig Gass as Al Pacino
 Roger Kabler as Robin Williams
 Anne Kissel as Roseanne Barr
 Suzanne LaRusch as Lucille Ball
 Buck McCoy as Tim McGraw
 Garry Moore as Little Richard
 John Morgan as George W. Bush
 Jim Nieb as George W. Bush
 Sharon Owens as Barbra Streisand
 Natalie Reid as Paris Hilton
 Pavel Sfera as Bono
 Stacey Whitton Summers as Shania Twain
 Brigitte Valdez as Celine Dion
 Cookie Watkins as Tina Turner
 Mike Wilson as Simon Cowell
 Mark Staycer as John Lennon

Finalists

Of the 30 semi-finalists, the judges chose the following 10 to be finalists:

 Sebastian Anzaldo
 Trent Carlini
 Donny Edwards
 Roger Kabler
 Suzanne LaRusch
 Garry Moore
 John Morgan
 Sharon Owens
 Natalie Reid
 Cookie Watkins
 Erv Dahl

Order of finish
American viewers voted, and ranked the finalists in the following order:

 Trent Carlini
 Sebastian Anzaldo
 Donny Edwards
 John Morgan
 Suzanne LaRusch

As the winner, Trent Carlini received $100,000.

Trivia

 The ten finalists of season 1 included two Elvis Presley impersonators; to reduce confusion, they were named "Blue Suede Elvis" (Donny Edwards) and "Heartbreak Elvis" (Trent Carlini), after the songs "Blue Suede Shoes" and "Heartbreak Hotel."
 Little Richard appeared as a "surprise celebrity guest" in the last episode of season 1 (#108).
 On The Next Best Thing Episode 6, "Semi-Finals, Part 2", On July 11, 2007, Trent Carlini As Elvis Presley Dipping Michele Merkin, With Her Ponytail Hairstyle, Rubble band, Earrings, Red Lipstick, Black Tube Top Skirt Dress, Bracelet, Microphone, & Her High Heel Shoes. & He Pull Her Back Up. Is Supposed to Be on the YouTube Videos with Full Length Episodes.

External links 
 Official website (via Internet Archive)
 

2007 American television series debuts
2007 American television series endings
2000s American reality television series
American Broadcasting Company original programming
English-language television shows